Blackstone Building may refer to:

Blackstone Building (Los Angeles) (1916), listed as a Los Angeles Historic-Cultural Monument
Blackstone Building (Fort Wayne, Indiana), listed on the NRHP in Indiana
Blackstone Building (Tyler, Texas), listed on the NRHP in Texas